Colin Stuart Gabelmann (born February 11, 1944) is a former politician in British Columbia. He represented North Vancouver-Seymour from 1972 to 1975 and North Island from 1979 to 1996 in the Legislative Assembly of British Columbia as a New Democratic Party (NDP) member.

He was born in London, England, the son of Honora Elsie Puddifoot and Fritz Gabelmann and was educated at the University of British Columbia. Gabelmann married  Robin Geary. He lived in Campbell River, British Columbia. He served as both opposition and government whip during his time in the provincial assembly. Gabelmann also served in the provincial cabinet as Attorney General.

References 

1944 births
Living people
Attorneys General of British Columbia
British Columbia New Democratic Party MLAs
Members of the Executive Council of British Columbia
University of British Columbia alumni